Museo d'Arte Sacra della Marsica (Italian for Religious art Museum of Marsica)  is a  museum of religious art in Celano, Province of L'Aquila (Abruzzo).

History

Collection

Notes

External links

Celano
Museums in Abruzzo
Religious museums in Italy
National museums of Italy